In the geologic timescale, the Gorstian is an age of the  Ludlow Epoch of the Silurian Period of the Paleozoic Era of the Phanerozoic Eon that is comprehended between 427.4 ± 0.5 Ma and 425.6 ± 0.9 Ma (million years ago), approximately. The Gorstian Age succeeds the Homerian Age and precedes the Ludfordian Age. The age is named after Gorsty village southwest of Ludlow. The base of the age is marked by Graptolites tumescens and Graptolites incipiens. The type section is located in a quarry in the Elton Formation at Pitch Coppice, Shropshire, United Kingdom.

References 

 
Ludlow epoch
Silurian geochronology